The Reynard 863 is an open-wheel Formula 3 race car, designed, developed and built by Reynard in 1986.

References

Open wheel racing cars
Formula Three cars
Reynard Motorsport vehicles